The Phillip and Patricia Frost Museum of Science (formerly known as the Miami Science Museum or Miami Science Museum and Space Transit Planetarium) is a science museum, planetarium, and aquarium located in Miami, Florida, United States. The museum originally opened its Coconut Grove location across from Vizcaya Museum and Gardens in 1960. It relocated to Museum Park in the downtown area adjacent to the Perez Art Museum Miami in 2017 after the closing of the Coconut Grove location in 2015.

History
In 1950, the Junior League of Miami opened the Junior Museum of Miami. It was located inside a house on the corner of Biscayne Boulevard and NE 26th Street. Women of the Junior League started it with little seed money and lots of volunteer hours. The exhibits were made up of donated items, such as a hive of live honeybees which hung outside a window, and loaned materials, such as Seminole artifacts from the University of Florida.

In 1952, the museum relocated to a larger space in the Miami Women's Club building on North Bayshore Drive. At that time it was renamed Museum of Science and Natural History.

In 1953, the Guild of the Museum of Science was formed, adding volunteers to assist the staff, run the museum store, and conduct tours and outreach programs.

In 1960, Dade County built a new  museum building on a  site in an area of Miami called Coconut Grove, on property belonging to the Vizcaya Museum and Gardens complex.

In 1966, the Space Transit Planetarium was added with a Spitz Model B Space Transit Projector. One of only 12 of its type that were built, the projector was the last one still in operation when the museum closed in 2015. The Planetarium was the home of the national astronomy television show Star Gazers with Jack Horkheimer, produced by Miami's PBS member  station WPBT.

In 2011, the museum launched and hosted the annual Miami Underwater Festival, in partnership with the French Festival Mondial de l’Image Sous-Marine (World Festival of Underwater Images). The festival was founded and sponsored by underwater photographer Marko Dimitrijevic and his wife, Shelly.

In 1989, the museum's lease agreement with Vizcaya was extended by 99 years, to 2088.

In 2015, the museum's Coconut Grove location closed in anticipation of the new museum's opening in 2017. The dismantled Spitz projector was moved to the HistoryMiami museum in downtown Miami and placed on permanent display.

Relocation 

In March 2011, Miami native Phillip Frost and his wife, Patricia, donated $35 million for the construction of a new science museum in downtown Miami. The museum was designed by the New York studio of global firm Grimshaw Architects; Miami's Rodriguez & Quiroga Architects Chartered played an executive role.

Completed at a cost of $305 million, the new  Philip and Patricia Frost Museum of Science opened on May 8, 2017, in downtown Miami's Museum Park.

 The three-story, cone-shaped,  Aquarium is open to the top level and also includes a  diameter oculus lens at the bottom for viewing the fish, rays and sharks.

 The North and West Wings contain permanent and rotating exhibit galleries, Guest and Member Services, concessions and the gift shop, offices, and the Knight Learning Center with four classrooms.

As of May 11, 2022 the future of the museum's old building remains uncertain; plans to demolish the museum and turn the property into an urban garden have been shelved.

Exhibits

Aquarium
The museum features a multi-level aquarium featuring habitats commonly seen in South Florida and the surrounding areas. The top deck of the Aquarium features key South Florida ecosystems, including the 100-foot wide, 500,000-gallon Gulf Stream Aquarium, where creatures such as mahi-mahi, devil rays, hammerhead sharks and others can be found. The middle level features habitats such as: coral reefs, mangrove forests, and the Gulf Stream. Nearly 30 aquariums and interactive vessels are included to demonstrate the bio-diversity of sub tropical habitats. The bottom-most level exhibits the Gulf Stream Aquarium where drifters such as jellyfish ride the massive flow running along Florida's east coast and into the North Atlantic. The aquarium culminates on this floor with a 31-foot oculus lens forming the bottom of the Gulf Stream Aquarium.

Planetarium
The Frost Planetarium seats 250 people and features six 16-million-color 8K projectors, surround sound, and a 67-foot wide dome screen tilted forward at 23.5°. The planetarium also hosts laser show nights on select dates featuring laser graphics set to music from bands such as Pink Floyd and Queen.

Power of Science
The Power of Science exhibits the past achievements of scientists and researchers, while also exhibiting the future of science. The exhibit hosts a series of hands-on exhibits, interactives, rare specimens, an interactive floor, a deep dive into the periodic table of elements, a showcase of collection pieces and scientific instruments used across various scientific fields, and more. Guests learn about the scientific process and other related concepts.  The exhibit focuses on four main realms of science: the ocean, the environment, the human body, and the universe.

Solar System and Beyond
Solar System and Beyond showcases over 20 photos and artist renderings of celestial objects by NASA.

Feathers to the Stars
Feathers to the Stars exhibits the history of flight from animals utilizing wings, to humans creating airplanes and spacecraft. The exhibit features demonstrations of lift, drag, and thrust using a small wind tunnel. The exhibit also features a glass cabinet of assorted NASA memorabilia and artifacts.

River of Grass
The River of Grass is an interactive exhibit focused on the Everglades primarily for children. The exhibit consists of two spaces: an outdoor hands-on area, and an indoor virtual Everglades  where animal characters interact with guests and teach them about concepts such as biodiversity using stories.

The Sun Spot
This exhibit teaches guests about solar power and the sun. This exhibition has six different exhibits showing different applications for solar power and different methods of utilizing it. The exhibit is located on the roof of the museum.

See also
 List of Astronomical Observatories
 List of planetariums
 Star Gazers

References

External links

Museum website
Photos of the old museum
Manual for the Christie Mirage 304 projectors

Museums in Miami
Planetaria in the United States
Coconut Grove (Miami)
Science museums in Florida
Natural history museums in Florida
Museums established in 1949
1949 establishments in Florida
Aquaria in Florida
History of Miami